Vincent Landais (born 17 October 1991) is a French rally co-driver. He is the co-driver of the French rally driver Sébastien Ogier, racing for Toyota Gazoo Racing WRT in the World Rally Championship.

Rally career
Landais and Loubet started in 2015, when they were competing in the Junior World Rally Championship. They won the WRC-2 championship in 2019. The French crew is set to make their WRC debut in a factory-supported Hyundai i20 Coupe WRC in Estonia, driving for Hyundai 2C Competition team.

Rally results

WRC results
 
* Season still in progress.

WRC-2 results

References

External links
 Vincent Landais's e-wrc profile

1991 births
Living people
French rally co-drivers
World Rally Championship co-drivers